Preston Gates & Ellis, LLP, also known as Preston Gates, was a law firm with offices in the United States, China and Taiwan. Its main office was in the IDX Tower in Seattle, Washington. In 2007 the firm ceased to exist, merging with Kirkpatrick & Lockhart Nicholson Graham to form K&L Gates.

The "Gates" in the firm's name refers to William H. Gates Sr., father of Microsoft founder Bill Gates. Gates retired from the firm in 1998.

History

Formation
In 1883, Harold Preston, born 1858 in Illinois, the son of Brig. Gen. Simon Manly Preston, arrived in Seattle and established his own law practice. Together with O.B. Thorgrimson, an attorney originally from Chicago, Preston expanded the practice throughout the early 1900s. In 1949 Jim Ellis joined the firm, and was integral in involving the firm in public service projects for the city of Seattle, and opened the firm's Washington, DC office in 1973. Ellis eventually became a name partner in the firm, which was known in the 1980s as Preston Thorgrimson Ellis & Holman.

In 1924, Roger Shidler and George Harroun established another law firm based in Washington State. William H. Gates Sr. joined the firm in 1964, and as principal counsel expanded the firm's clients to include high technology, manufacturing, distribution, service and other businesses. By 1990, the firm was known as Shidler McBroom Gates and Lucas.

In 1990, Shidler McBroom Gates and Lucas merged with Preston Thorgrimson Ellis & Holman to form Preston Thorgrimson Shidler Gates & Ellis, renamed in 1997 as Preston Gates & Ellis, LLP.

The firm's Washington, DC office is known as Preston Gates Ellis & Rouvelas Meeds LLP. When it was opened in 1973, partners included Emanuel Rouvelas, former counsel to the Senate Commerce Committee, and former Congressman Lloyd Meeds (D-WA). Among its major clients is Microsoft, which paid PGE over $1,380,000 for lobbying various federal government institutions. During that time the chairman of the firm was William Neukom, who was employed by Microsoft as head of its legal department.

References

External links
 Firm website

Law firms established in 1883
Law firms based in Seattle
Defunct law firms of the United States
Defunct companies based in Seattle
1883 establishments in Washington Territory
2007 disestablishments in Washington (state)
Law firms disestablished in 2007